Madhabkunda waterfall is one of the highest waterfalls in Bangladesh. It is situated in Barlekha Upazila in Moulvibazar District. The waterfall is a popular tourist spot in Bangladesh. Big boulders, surrounding forest, and the adjoining streams attracts many tourists for picnic parties and day trips.

History
During a hunting expedition in the Patharia hills, Raja Govardhan of Gour (reigned 1250–1260) wished to establish a resting place for the benefit of travellers. He came across a monk by the name of Madhabeshwar meditating under a waterfall. In respect of the monk, the waterfall was called Madhabkunda waterfall.

Transport

Visitors can visit Madhabkunda either from Sylhet or Moulvibazar by road, or from Kulaura Junction by train.

Gallery

Sources

External links
 Travel Bangladesh, Discovery Bangladesh
 The Independent Bangladesh, Newspaper

Waterfalls of Bangladesh
Barlekha Upazila